SMPTE 2059 is a standard from the Society of Motion Picture and Television Engineers (SMPTE) that describes how to synchronize video equipment over an IP network. The standard is based on IEEE 1588-2008. SMPTE 2059 is published in two parts on 9 April 2015:
SMPTE 2059-1Defines signal generation based on time information delivered by the IEEE 1588 protocol.
SMPTE 2059-2Defines an operating profile for the IEEE protocol optimized to the needs of media synchronization.

SMPTE 2059 is an integral part of emerging professional IP video broadcast technology and standards.

In May 2016, the Audio Engineering Society published a report describing synchronization interoperability between AES67 and SMPTE 2059-2.

Operating parameters

References

SMPTE standards